Lost Romance is a 2020 Taiwanese romantic-fantasy television series created and produced by Sanlih E-Television. Starring Marcus Chang and Vivian Sung, it tells the story of an editor in a publishing company who magically finds herself transported into the pages of a romance novel – and comes face-to-face with the man of her dreams. The series premiered on Sundays at 10:00 p.m. on TTV in Taiwan from June 7, 2020, to October 18, 2020, and aired on Saturdays at 10:00 p.m. on cable television SET Metro from June 13, 2020, to October 24, 2020. The series was filmed as it aired. It is available for streaming internationally on Viki, Vidol, and Netflix with multilingual subtitles for the global viewers.

The behind-the-scenes clips were broadcast at the end of each episode under the name Encountering Romance Every Second. (Chinese: 遇見浪漫的每一秒).

Cast

Main cast

 Marcus Chang as He Tianxing/Situ Aoran
 Vivian Sung as Zheng Xiao'en
 Simon Lien as Duanmu Qingfeng/Chen Qing

Supporting cast

 Kelly Liao as He Mingli
 Jason Hsu as He Tianjian/Situ Moran
 Snowbaby Tsai as Ling Chuchu/Chu Chu
Tang Zhi Wei as Hu Chaoqin
Don Wong as He Zhaonan
 Kiki Chen as Susanna/Susan
 Pii as Lin Chuntian/Lin Qiutian 
 Sean Lin as Jason
 Deyn Li as George
 Hsu Yuan Kang as Yao Guping
 Hsiao Yao as Xu Qiongmei
Feng Xian Bo as Chu Yun
Jacky Liu as Dr. Pan
 Tannie Huang as Dr. Sun

Special appearances

 Belle Chuo as Dong Fangmeng
 Tony Sun as Cheng Qing
 Puff Kuo as Liu Mushuang

Production
Marcus Chang had previously collaborated with director Eri Hao on the 2018 television series Between. Prior to filming, Marcus Chang had been actively doing weight training and going on a high-protein diet; hoping he could achieve the “cheetah-like” figure described in the script for his role as an overbearing CEO.

This marked Marcus Chang's second collaboration with Vivian Sung since their 2014 film Café. Waiting. Love and his fourth collaboration with Sanlih E-Television. The series is Vivian Sung's small screen comeback in Taiwan after five years.

The entire cast and crew attended the opening press conference held on April 14, 2020.

Filming took place almost entirely in Taichung as well as other locations in Taiwan including Nantou County, Changhua County, and Yunlin County.

Scenes from the wedding ceremony were filmed at the Vena Manor, a popular wedding venue in Changhua County.

The series was awarded $15 million NT in tax credits by the Ministry of Culture of Taiwan.

Pop Relevance

Fan meeting
With 2000 fans at the event, Marcus Chang, Vivian Sung, Simon Lien, and rest of the cast attended the Lost Romance fan meeting, which was held on August 1, 2020, at Chungyo Department Store in Taichung.

LINE stickers
In collaboration with LINE TV, Lost Romance launched its own LINE stickers, featuring Marcus Chang and Vivian Sung.

Soundtrack

Episode ratings
Competing dramas on rival channels airing at the same time slot were:

CTS – I, Myself, Recipe of Life, U Motherbaker
FTV – The Mirror, The Rootless, The Story of Three Springs, Animal Whisper
CTV – Attention, Love! (re-run), Chinese Restaurant (re-run), Chinese Restaurant season 3
SET Taiwan – Top Singers

 Numbers in  denote the highest rating and numbers in  denote the lowest rating for the drama's tenure.
 Ratings are obtained from AGB Nielsen.

Broadcast

References

External links
 (TTV)
 (SET Metro)

Taiwan Television original programming
Sanlih E-Television original programming
2020 Taiwanese television series debuts
2020 Taiwanese television series endings
Taiwanese drama television series
Taiwanese romance television series
Taiwanese romantic comedy television series
Taiwanese romantic fiction
Taiwanese time travel television series